Alem Cultural and Entertainment Center is a cultural center in Ashgabat, Turkmenistan. It was officially opened to the public on May 18, 2012. The opening ceremony was attended by the President of Turkmenistan, Gurbanguly Berdimuhamedov.

A  diameter glass and white-steel casing on top of the building contains a Ferris wheel known as 'Alem', meaning 'The Universe'. Alem was recognised by Guinness World Records as the world's tallest Ferris wheel in an enclosed space at the time of the opening ceremony.

References 

Event venues in Turkmenistan
Buildings and structures in Ashgabat
Buildings and structures completed in 2012